Michael David May FRS FREng (born 24 February 1951) is a British computer scientist. He is a Professor in the Department of Computer Science at the University of Bristol and founder of XMOS Semiconductor, serving until February 2014 as the chief technology officer.

May was lead architect for the transputer. As of 2017, he holds 56 patents, all in microprocessors and multi-processing.

Life and career 
May was born in Holmfirth, Yorkshire, England and attended Queen Elizabeth Grammar School, Wakefield. From 1969 to 1972 he was a student at King's College, Cambridge, University of Cambridge, at first studying Mathematics and then Computer Science in the University of Cambridge Mathematical Laboratory, now the University of Cambridge Computer Laboratory.

He moved to the University of Warwick and started research in robotics. The challenges of implementing sensing and control systems led him to design and implement an early concurrent programming language, EPL, which ran on a cluster of single-board microcomputers connected by serial communication links. This early work brought him into contact with Tony Hoare and Iann Barron: one of the founders of Inmos.

When Inmos was formed in 1978, May joined to work on microcomputer architecture, becoming lead architect of the transputer and designer of the associated programming language Occam. This extended his earlier work and was also influenced by Tony Hoare, who was at the time working on CSP and acting as a consultant to Inmos.
 
The prototype of the transputer was called the Simple 42 and was completed in 1982. The first production transputers, the T212 and T414, followed in 1985; the T800 floating point transputer in 1987. May initiated the design of one of the first VLSI packet switches, the C104, together with the communications system of the T9000 transputer.

Working closely with Tony Hoare and the Programming Research Group at Oxford University, May introduced formal verification techniques into the design of the T800 floating point unit and the T9000 transputer. These were some of the earliest uses of formal verification in microprocessor design, involving specifications, correctness preserving transformations and model checking, giving rise to the initial version of the FDR checker developed at Oxford.

In 1995, May joined the University of Bristol as a professor of computer science. He was head of the computer science department from 1995 to 2006. He continues to be a professor at Bristol while supporting XMOS, a University spin-out he co-founded in 2005.  Before XMOS, he was involved in Picochip, where he wrote the original instruction set.

May is married with three sons and lives in Bristol, United Kingdom.

Awards and recognition 
In 1990, May received an Honorary DSc from the University of Southampton, followed in 1991 by his election as a Fellow of The Royal Society and the Clifford Paterson Medal and Prize of the Institute of Physics in 1992.

In 2010, he was elected a Fellow of the Royal Academy of Engineering.

May's law 

May's Law states, in reference to Moore's Law:

References 

Academics of the University of Bristol
Alumni of King's College, Cambridge
Alumni of the University of Warwick
British computer scientists
Chief technology officers
Computer designers
Computer hardware engineers
Formal methods people
Fellows of the Royal Society
Fellows of the Royal Academy of Engineering
History of computing in the United Kingdom
1951 births
Living people
People educated at Queen Elizabeth Grammar School, Wakefield